Şıxoba (also, Shykhoba and Shykh-Obesy) is a village in the Shaki Rayon of Azerbaijan.  The village forms part of the municipality of Aydınbulaq.

References 

Populated places in Shaki District